Rhynchophora is a genus in the Malpighiaceae, a family of about 75 genera of flowering plants in the order Malpighiales. Rhynchophora comprises two species of slender woody vines native to  Madagascar. The distinctive three to four-winged fruit resembles a helicopter and is unique in the family.

External links and reference
Malpighiaceae Malpighiaceae - description, taxonomy, phylogeny, and nomenclature
Rhynchophora
Anderson, W. R. 2001. Observations on the Malagasy genus Rhynchophora (Malpighiaceae). Contributions from the University of Michigan Herbarium 23: 53–58.

Malpighiaceae
Malpighiaceae genera